Anthony M. Imperiale Sr. (July 10, 1931 – December 27, 1999) was a member of the New Jersey Legislature from Newark, New Jersey.

Early life
He was born on July 10, 1931, in Newark, New Jersey. He later served in the United States Marine Corps during the Korean War. In the 1960s he opposed forced race-integration busing in the United States.

1967 Newark riots 
During the 1967 Newark riots, Imperiale advocated armed white self-defense and formed the volunteer North Ward First Aid Squad ostensibly to escort North Ward residents, most of whom were Italian-American, through racially troubled neighborhoods.

The group was accused of vigilantism, and Governor Richard J. Hughes called Imperiale's followers "Brownshirts". At one point during the riots, Imperiale warned that "when the Black Panther comes, the white hunter will be waiting."

In 1969, the group disbanded.

Political career

Newark City Council 
Imperiale was elected to the Newark City Council in 1968 and re-elected in 1970.

In 1970, he ran for mayor, but finished third in a six-man field. He failed to advance to the run-off between incumbent mayor Hugh Addonizio and Kenneth A. Gibson.

State Assembly 
Imperiale was elected to the New Jersey General Assembly in 1971. Running as an independent on a "For the People" ticket, he received the most votes in a field of 7 candidates.

On his arrival in the Assembly in 1972, Imperiale declined to join either major party. He went so far as to plant his seat in the aisle separating the two parties and refused to move out of the way. At the time, Democrats had a slim 40-39 advantage in the chamber.

State Senate 
In 1973, Imperiale ran as an independent for the New Jersey State Senate, seeking an open seat in the newly created 30th district, which comprised Newark's East Ward, and the towns of Harrison and Kearny. Imperiale received 24,756 votes (49%), against Democrat Gregory J. Castano with 18,286 votes (36%) and Fiore, with 7,131 votes (14%).

1974 mayoral campaign 
Imperiale ran for Mayor of Newark in 1974 against incumbent Kenneth Gibson, but lost with 43.7% of the vote.

He was defeated for re-election to the State Senate in 1977 against Frank E. Rodgers, the Mayor of Harrison, New Jersey.

Return to State Assembly 
He was again elected to the State Assembly in 1979, this time as a Republican. He defeated three-term Democratic Assemblyman John F. Cali.

1981 gubernatorial campaign 
He gave up his Assembly seat in 1981 to seek the Republican nomination for Governor of New Jersey, finishing 6th in a field of 8 candidates with 5% of the vote.

Later, Imperiale made unsuccessful bids for Essex County Freeholder, Essex County Sheriff, and U.S. Representative.

Personal life 
After leaving office, Imperiale founded a volunteer ambulance company in Newark. As a volunteer paramedic, he was praised by his former political rivals and for his generosity, sense of humor, and commitment to equal treatment.

In 1984, Imperiale's son Anthony Jr. was sentenced to nine years in prison for shooting and wounding a minor who was making noise outside his bedroom window.

In 1987, Imperiale's son Michael was shot and wounded by an off-duty police officer after the two got in a car accident.

He died on December 26, 1999, at Saint Barnabas Medical Center in Livingston, New Jersey of complications related to kidney failure.

References

External links

|-

|-

1931 births
1999 deaths
20th-century American politicians
United States Marine Corps personnel of the Korean War
American people of Italian descent
Anti-crime activists
New Jersey Independents
Republican Party New Jersey state senators
Members of the Municipal Council of Newark